Jon Michael Varese (born December 17, 1971) is an American novelist, historian, essayist, educator and technical writer. His 2018 debut novel The Spirit Photographer is set in  Reconstruction era Boston, Massachusetts and Louisiana plantation country.

Early life and education 
Varese was born in Miami, Florida. He was first introduced to literature and the work of Charles Dickens at the age of 14 through the mother of a friend. 

He graduated from Swarthmore College with a B.A. in English Literature, and earned his Masters and Ph.D. in Literature from the University of California, Santa Cruz. His dissertation, The Value of Storytelling (2011), examined the development of 19th-century serial novels in Great Britain, with a focus on the early novels of Charles Dickens, Wilkie Collins, and George Eliot. While finishing the dissertation, Varese worked as a technical writer in Silicon Valley.

Career

Fiction 
Varese's debut novel, The Spirit Photographer (2018), is loosely based on the 19th-century American spirit photographer, William Mumler. Varese drew from Mumler's biography to create an independent novel about a protagonist who was a photographer in Boston after having worked with Mathew Brady during the Civil War to photograph the dead. 

One day the photographer sees the face of an African-American woman he knew, who appears as a spirit in a glass-plate photograph of a couple seeking contact with their son who died young. The novel takes place during the Reconstruction era in U.S. history, exploring issues of northern and southern racism in post-Civil War America, and the role of spiritualism in dealing with the widespread grief due to losses during the war. Varese has said that the novel's story was influenced by the work of civil rights activists Bryan Stevenson and Michelle Alexander, who have emphasized the connection between slavery and racial injustice in the US since then.

The Times Literary Supplement said there was not "a dud word in this extraordinary debut novel," and compared Varese's writing to that of Wilkie Collins and Joseph Conrad. Booklist described the novel as "an addicting tale." Chronogram Magazine wrote that it was an ambitious, sprawling debut, "teeming with spirits, secrets, and trauma." PopMatters said that The Spirit Photographer was "atmospheric, lyrical, and poignant", and that it "deftly interweaves strands of history and fantasy."

Varese's second novel, The Company, is set to be published by John Murray in March 2023. The novel is said to be a ghostly thriller based on the true story of arsenic-laced wallpaper in the 19th century.

Nonfiction and literary criticism 
Varese’s nonfiction and literary criticism have focused on the work of Charles Dickens, particularly Dickens’s early novels and the publishing business that supported their development. Varese’s edition of Great Expectations was published in 2012 under the Signature imprint of Barnes and Noble publishers. 

Similarly, Varese's journalism recasts topics in Victorian literature for general audiences, including a series of pieces that he wrote for The Guardian from 2009-2010.

Varese was an original contributor to the Oxford Handbook of Charles Dickens. His chapter on Nicholas Nickleby examined the role of contracts and English contract law in relation to Dickens’s fiction during a time when concepts such as copyright, intellectual property, and royalty payments were being developed and debated in both professional and legal spheres.

Teaching and outreach work 
Varese served as the Director of Digital Initiatives for The Dickens Project from 2010-2016. Earlier he had directed the development of the Our Mutual Friend Scholarly Pages (1998), a collaborative digital archive co-sponsored by The Dickens Project and the British Broadcasting Corporation (BBC). The collaboration produced one of the first of a few digital archiving projects to be published on the Internet. It was revised for the bi-centenary of Dickens’s birth in 2012.

In 2016, Varese was named Director of Public Outreach for The Dickens Project, a role he still occupies. He conducts liaison work between The Dickens Project and the University of Southern California’s Neighborhood Academic Initiative (NAI), USC’s primary outreach program to Title 1 schools in South Central Los Angeles. The partnership provides books, curricula advisement, mentorship, and funding for students who are on a dedicated college-bound path as a result of the program.

References

External links 
 Official website
 The Reading Life with Susan Larson
 The Oxford Handbook to Charles Dickens
 

21st-century American male writers
1971 births
American male novelists
21st-century American novelists
University of California, Santa Cruz alumni
Swarthmore College alumni
Writers from Miami
Novelists from Florida
Living people